Thomas Greechan is a Scottish born international lawn bowls player from Jersey. He became the British singles champion after winning the British Isles Bowls Championships in 2016.

Bowls career

World Championships
Greechan has competed for Jersey at two World Bowls Championships in 2000 and 2012.

Commonwealth Games
He has represented Jersey at two Commonwealth Games; at the 2002 and the 2014 Commonwealth Games.

Other events
In addition to his British Isles Championship success he won the Jersey's first World Singles Champion of Champions in 2011, in Hong Kong. He beat Jonathan Ross of Scotland in a tie-break set 5–0, despite dropping the first set.

Greechan also medalled at the 2007 Atlantic Bowls Championships, with silver in the men's fours event. Jersey's bowls team, which finished second in the overall combined medal table at the Games, narrowly missed out on 2008 Channel Islands' Team of the Year to Jersey's cricketers.

Family and awards

In 2012, Thomas Greechan was voted Channel Islands' Sports Personality of the Year and won Sports Person of the Year in Jersey. He has also been selected as Jersey's men's outdoor Bowler of the Year twice, in 2005, and 2006.

References

Jersey bowls players
1976 births
Living people
Bowls players at the 2002 Commonwealth Games
Bowls players at the 2014 Commonwealth Games
Commonwealth Games competitors for Jersey